Obsession is the fourth album by American jazz trumpeter Wallace Roney which was recorded in 1990 and released on the Muse label early the following year.

Reception

The AllMusic review by Ken Dryden stated, "In the early days of his career, trumpeter Wallace Roney was tagged as being yet another Miles Davis-influenced player, though a focused hearing of his fourth CD as a leader will demonstrate how much he was developing his own voice on this exciting hard bop session ... An enjoyable early effort".

Track listing
All compositions by Wallace Roney except where noted
 "Obsession" − 6:09	
 "Scenario One" (Cindy Blackman) − 7:58
 "Alone Together" (Arthur Schwartz, Howard Dietz) − 8:53	
 "Seven" − 7:27
 "Black Moon" (Christian McBride) − 7:37
 "Donna Lee" (Charlie Parker) − 4:21

Personnel 
Wallace Roney − trumpet
Gary Thomas − tenor saxophone, flute
Donald Brown − piano 
Christian McBride − bass
Cindy Blackman − drums

References 

1991 albums
Wallace Roney albums
Albums recorded at Van Gelder Studio
Muse Records albums